The crimson-browed finch (Carpodacus subhimachalus) is a true finch species (family Fringillidae). It is found in Bhutan, China, India, Myanmar, and Nepal. Its natural habitats are temperate forests and temperate shrubland.

This is a large finch with a large short bill. The male has a crimson red head and throat. The female has a yellow head and throat.

The species was described by the British naturalist Brian Houghton Hodgson in 1836 under the binomial name Corythus subhimachalus. The species name subhimachalus combines the Latin sub meaning 'beneath' and the Hindi word himachal meaning snow.  The crimson-browed finch was formerly placed in the genus Pinicola but was moved to the rosefinch genus Carpodacus based on the results from the phylogenetic analyses of mitochondrial and nuclear DNA sequences.

References

crimson-browed finch
Birds of Nepal
Birds of Bhutan
Birds of Tibet
Birds of Central China
crimson-browed finch
Taxonomy articles created by Polbot